Anarchism in Portugal first appeared in the form of organized groups in the mid-1880s. It was present from the first steps of the workers' movement, revolutionary unionism and anarcho-syndicalism had a lasting influence on the General Confederation of Labour, founded in 1919.

The 28 May 1926 coup d'état established a National Dictatorship that harshly repressed the workers' movement. The Estado Novo made any anarchist activity illegal, which forced the libertarian movement to clandestine action. In 1974, after the fall of the dictatorship in the Carnation Revolution, the Hot Summer of 1975 brought about a sense of "anarcho-populism", a residue of the spirit of May 1968.

History
From the 1850s, the thought and writings of Pierre-Joseph Proudhon considerably influenced the first workers' associations and writers.

The Portuguese section of the International Workingmen's Association was formed in 1871. The doctor and writer Eduardo Maia, initially a socialist, turned towards anarchism after reading the works of Peter Kropotkin. As a member of the Portuguese section of the International Association of Workers, he was considered one of the first Portuguese anarchists.

In 1886, Antero de Quental, Eça de Queiros, Guerra Junqueiro and Ramalho Ortigão formed the Cenáculo, a group of anarchist intellectuals in revolt against the political, social and intellectual conventions of their time. He would later be one of the founders of the Portuguese Socialist Party.

Emergence of the libertarian movement

The first anarchist groups appeared in the mid-1880s. A period of intense editorial activity then began, as several dozen anarchist periodicals were published throughout the country. Under the influence of Élisée Reclus and Peter Kropotkin, libertarian communism appeared in Lisbon and Porto around 1886–1887, with the publication of a few libertarian periodicals and the establishment of the first agitprop groups. The Portuguese state also legalized trade unions in 1891.

Along with trade unionism, propaganda was developed in particular by journalist José do Vale, editor of the newspapers O Petardo and La Dinamite. The "exemplary gesture" is practically daily and appears, in a way, as a complement to "legal action", when this has exhausted its possibilities. A wave of individual attacks targeted journalists (such as Manuel Pinheiro Chagas in February 1888 for disrespecting Louise Michel), bosses, representatives of the State or the judiciary such as Judge Barros in 1896.

Faced with the specter of "revolutionary terror", the State adopted in 1896 – following the example of the French villainous laws – a special law against anarchist activities. This law reproduced in Portugal the repressive policies of other countries which targeted anarchists and the labor movement, culminating in the International Conference of Rome for the Social Defense Against Anarchists in 1898.

This new legal instrument now allowed the arrest of anyone who "supports, defends or incites, orally or in writing, a subversive action [...] or professes anarchist doctrines". The press was formally prohibited from reporting on activities, police investigations and proceedings concerning anarchists. The courts expelled "hundreds of dangerous or suspect workers" to Guinea-Bissau, Mozambique and especially Timor.

The General Confederation of Labor

Under the influence of revolutionary unionism, workers' structures developed very rapidly from 1909. The General Confederation of Labour was founded on 18 September 1919 in Coimbra, on libertarian bases. Manuel Joaquim de Sousa was elected general secretary. The fundamental principles and objectives of the CGT, adopted at this congress are: the free autonomous federation of workers; direct action – outside any political or religious influence – with a view to eliminating the wage system; the collectivization of the means of production; the internationalism of workers' solidarity and the elimination of capitalism. The confederation created a newspaper A Batalha (The battle) which defended revolutionary unionist positions.

It was not until 1922, after joining the International Workers' Association that the CGT asserted itself as anarcho-syndicalist. Until the end of the 1930s, anarcho-syndicalism was the majority current in the labor movement. It was only following the Bolsheviks seizure of power in Russia, and the subjugation of local workers' organizations to the Portuguese Communist Party, that this influence was marginalized.

The Iberian Anarchist Federation
A few days before the 28 May 1926 coup d'état, on the initiative of Manuel Joaquim de Sousa, the Iberian Anarchist Federation (FAI) was founded in Marseille, at the second Congress of the Federation of Spanish-speaking anarchist groups. Influenced by the example of the Argentine Regional Workers' Federation, the objective was to strengthen the anarchist character of the Spanish National Confederation of Labour and the Portuguese General Confederation of Labour, by creating joint committees bringing together FAI members and trade unionists to move the union away from the influence of Republican political groups. The term Iberian referred to his desire to unify the Portuguese and Spanish anarchist movement in a pan-Iberian organization. Given the political instability in Spain, its headquarters were in Lisbon.

The military dictatorship and repression

In 1926, a military coup led by Manuel Gomes da Costa put an end to the First Portuguese Republic. In 1933, under the leadership of António de Oliveira Salazar, a new constitution was proclaimed, the Estado Novo. In the new, authoritarian, one-party state, strikes were declared illegal and the workers' and employers' unions came under state control. The CGT and its newspaper were banned. Many anarcho-syndicalist activists are arrested and imprisoned. In 1936, the Tarrafal concentration camp was opened on Santiago Island, in Cape Verde.

On 4 July 1937, a group of anarchists, including Emídio Santana, attempted to assassinate Salazar while he was going to mass, but the dictator narrowly escaped the attack. Santana was now wanted by PIDE and fled to the United Kingdom, where he was arrested by the English police and extradited to Portugal. He was sentenced to 8 years in prison and 12 years of deportation. He was not released until 23 May 1953. The repression that followed this attempted attack was such that there was hardly any anarchist movement from that time on. It was the Portuguese Communist Party which developed and which, with the support of the Soviet Union, became the main force in opposition to the dictatorial regime.

Contemporary period

Currently, the anarchist movement in Portugal has little organized expression, with only one national organization, the Portuguese Section of the International Workers' Association, with branches in Guimarães, Lisbon and Porto. In Lisbon there is also the Colectivo Estudantil Libertário de Lisboa, with presence in secondary schools and colleges. In Almada, there is a Libertarian Culture Center.

There have been some attempts to federate various anarchist and libertarian groups and individuals in modern times, with the main examples being União Libertária and Rede de Apoio Mútuo.

See also 
Anarchism in Angola
Anarchism in Brazil
Anarchism in East Timor
Anarchism in Guinea-Bissau
Anarchism in Mozambique
Anarchism in Spain

References

Bibliography

 .

External links
 Guilhotina.info
 Portal Anarquista, from the Colectivo Libertário de Évora

 
Political movements in Portugal
Portugal